The Ophiceratidae is a family in the ammonoid order Ceratitida from the Lower Triassic, previously included in the Otocerataceae but now placed in the Noritiaceae as revised.

The Ophiceratidae produced sepenticones with compressed elliptical whorl sections in which the venter is generally rounded and ornamentation is usually weak. The suture is simple, ceratitic.

Named genera include  Ophiceras, the type, Discophiceras, Nordophiceras, Sakhaites, Vishnuites, and Wordieoceras.

The phonetically similar Ophioceratidae of Strand 1934 is synonymous with Ophidioceratidae Hyatt, 1894
a family in the nautiloid cephalopod order, Tarphycerida.

References 

 Arkell et al. 1957, Mesozoic Ammonoidea,(L132)in the Treatise on Invertebrate Paleontology, Part-L, Ammonoidea; Geological Soc. of America, reprinted 1990.
 Furnish & Glenister, 1864, Nautiloidea - Tarphycerda (K367)in the Treatise on Invertebrate Paleontology, Part-K; Geological Soc. of America
  Paleobiology Database July 2009

Noritoidea
Ceratitida families
Early Triassic first appearances
Early Triassic extinctions